John Dewey Hickerson (January 26, 1898 – January 18, 1989) was an American diplomat.

Biography

John D. Hickerson was born at Crawford, Texas on January 26, 1898.  He was educated at the University of Texas at Austin, receiving a B.A. in 1920.

After college, Hickerson joined the United States Foreign Service.  He was a vice consul in Tampico, Tamaulipas from 1920 to 1922, then in Rio de Janeiro from 1922 to 1924.  He was then promoted to consul and served in that capacity at Pará in 1924-25 and at Ottawa 1925-27.  He moved to Washington, D.C. in 1928, becoming Assistant Chief of the United States Department of State's Division of West European Affairs, a position he held until 1940.  He also sat on the State Department's Board of Appeals & Review from 1934 until 1941.

In 1940, Hickerson became secretary of the American section of the newly formed Permanent Joint Board on Defense.  He held this position for the duration of World War II.  He also served as Chief of the State Department's Division of British Commonwealth Affairs in 1944, and from 1944 to 1947 was Deputy Director of the Office of European Affairs.  In this capacity, he was an adviser to the U.S. delegation to the Dumbarton Oaks Conference and to the United Nations Conference on International Organization.  In 1947, he was promoted to Director of the Office of European Affairs.

In 1949, President of the United States Harry Truman nominated Hickerson as Assistant Secretary of State for International Organization Affairs and Hickerson held this office from June 24, 1949 until July 27, 1953.  He then spent the next two years as a faculty adviser at the National War College.

President Dwight D. Eisenhower named Hickerson United States Ambassador to Finland in 1955; Hickerson presented his credentials on November 23, 1955 and left this post on November 3, 1959.  Eisenhower then appointed Hickerson as United States Ambassador to the Philippines, and Hickerson held this post from January 13, 1960 until December 8, 1961.

In retirement, Hickerson lived in Washington, D.C.  He died of cancer on January 18, 1989.

References
 "John D. Hickerson, 91; Foreign Service Officer", New York Times, Jan. 20, 1989
 Oral history from the Truman Library

1898 births
1989 deaths
United States Assistant Secretaries of State
People from Crawford, Texas
University of Texas at Austin alumni
Ambassadors of the United States to Finland
Ambassadors of the United States to the Philippines
United States Foreign Service personnel
20th-century American diplomats